Jori Jonatan Lehterä (born 23 December 1987) is a Finnish professional ice hockey player currently playing for Tappara of the Liiga. A centreman, he was selected by the St. Louis Blues in the third round, 65th overall, of the 2008 NHL Entry Draft. He won a bronze medal with Finland at the 2014 Winter Olympics.

Playing career
Lehterä dominated the Jokerit junior team in scoring, and earned himself a place on the team's SM-liiga roster in the fall of 2006. He was selected to represent Finland at the 2006 World Junior Ice Hockey Championships 2006 World Under-20's Championships in Sweden, but could not play due to an injury. In April 2007, he signed a three-year contract with Tappara.

Lehterä was drafted by the St. Louis Blues at the 2008 NHL Entry Draft in the third round, 65th overall. He made the move to North America for the 2008–09 season to play for the Peoria Rivermen, the American Hockey League (AHL) affiliate of the Blues. However, he played just seven games for Peoria, recording just one assist, before returning to Tappara in Finland to close out the season, where he was ultimately named the SM-liiga's Most Valuable Player (MVP) after scoring 19 goals and 50 assists for 69 points.

After playing one season with Lokomotiv Yaroslavl of the Kontinental Hockey League (KHL), Lehterä moved to KHL rivals Sibir Novosibirsk from 2011–12 to 2013–14, the latter of which he scored 12 goals and 32 assists to lead the team in points, with 44. After yearly consistent performances for Novosibirsk, he played for Finland at the 2014 Winter Olympics in Sochi, Russia, where he scored one goal and three assists in four games for the bronze medal-winning Finns.

On 1 July 2014, Lehterä signed a two-year, $5.5 million contract with the St. Louis Blues, the organization still retaining his NHL rights after initially drafting him in 2008. He was named the NHL's First Star of the Week for 10–17 November after posting four goals and two assists in three games for St. Louis.

He was traded by the Blues along with a first-round pick (27th overall) and conditional first-round pick in 2018 to the Philadelphia Flyers in exchange for Brayden Schenn, at the 2017 NHL Entry Draft on June 23, 2017.

He signed a one-year contract with the KHL's SKA Saint Petersburg on 6 June 2019. In the 2019–20 season, Lehterä posted 15 goals and 30 points in his return to the KHL before the season was abruptly ended due to COVID-19.

As a free agent at the conclusion of his contract, Lehterä opted to continue in the KHL, agreeing to a one-year deal with Spartak Moscow on 12 May 2020.

On 16 June 2022, Lehterä returned to play in Finnish Liiga for the first time in 12 years, agreeing to a one-year contract with former club and reigning champions, Tappara.

Personal 
Lehterä's uncle, Tero Lehterä, was a member of Finland's 1995 Ice Hockey World Championships gold medal team.

In September 2018, police in Finland announced that they had conducted a raid on his home, resulting in several arrests and the seizure of cocaine. Lehterä was not home at the time, but police believe that he is involved in a distribution ring with about twenty other people. On 1 January 2019, it was reported that Lehterä was not involved in the distribution part of the ring; just purchasing and possessing.

Career statistics

Regular season and playoffs

International

Awards and honours

References

External links

Jatkoaika.com player profile (in Finnish)

1987 births
Living people
Finnish ice hockey centres
Ice hockey players at the 2014 Winter Olympics
Jokerit players
Lehigh Valley Phantoms players
Medalists at the 2014 Winter Olympics
Olympic bronze medalists for Finland
Olympic ice hockey players of Finland
Olympic medalists in ice hockey
Ice hockey people from Helsinki
Peoria Rivermen (AHL) players
Philadelphia Flyers players
St. Louis Blues draft picks
HC Sibir Novosibirsk players
SKA Saint Petersburg players
HC Spartak Moscow players
Tappara players